Gigantes de Carolina may refer to:

Gigantes de Carolina (men's basketball), a men's basketball team in the Baloncesto Superior Nacional
Gigantes de Carolina (women's basketball), a women's basketball team
Gigantes de Carolina (baseball), a baseball team in the Puerto Rico Baseball League
Gigantes de Carolina (women's volleyball), a women's volleyball team in the Liga de Voleibol Superior Femenino
Gigantes de Carolina (football club), an association football team in the Puerto Rico Soccer League